Treason Act or Treasons Act (and variations thereon) or Statute of Treasons is a stock short title used for legislation in the United Kingdom and in the Republic of Ireland on the subject of treason and related offences.

Several Acts on the subject of treason may also have different short titles, such as the Sedition Act.

The Treason Acts may refer to all statutes with this short title or to all statutes on the subject of treason and related offences.

List

England 
 62 acts (1351–1705)
The Treason Act 1351 (25 Edw. 3 Stat. 5 c.2)
The Forfeitures Act 1360 (34 Ed. 3 c. 12)
The Treason Act 1381 (5 Ric. 2 c. 6)
The Treason Act 1397 (21 Ric. 2 c. 12)
See also cc. 2, 3, 4, 6, 7 and 20
The Treason Act 1399 (1 Hen. 4 c. 10) (repealed the Treason Acts 1381 and 1397)
The Safe Conducts Act 1414 (2 Hen. 5 c. 6)
The Treason Act 1415 (3 Hen. 5 Stat. 2 c. 6)
See also 3 Hen. 5 St. 2 c. 7
The Treason Act 1423 (2 Hen. 6 c. 17)
The Treason Act 1429 (8 Hen. 6 c. 6)
The Treason Act 1442 (20 Hen. 6 c. 3)
 See also 20 Hen.6 c.11
The Treason Act 1448 (27 Hen. 6 c. 4)
The Act of Accord (1460) (39 Hen. 6 c. 1)
The Treason Act 1488 (4 Hen. 7 c. 18)
The Treason Act 1495 (11 Hen. 7 c. 1)
The Benefit of Clergy Act 1496 (12 Hen. 7 c. 7; abolished benefit of clergy for petit treason)
The Poisoning Act 1530 (22 Hen. 8 c. 9)
The Treasons Act 1534 (26 Hen. 8 c. 13)
The Treason Act 1535 (27 Hen. 8 c. 2)
The Act of Succession 1536 (28 Hen. 8 c. 7)
The See of Rome Act 1536 (28 Hen. 8 c. 10)
The Treason Act 1536 (28 Hen. 8 c. 18)
The Treason Act (Ireland) 1537 (28 Hen. 8 c. 7 (I.))
The Treasons in Wales Act 1540 (32 Hen. 8 c. 4)
The Treason Act 1540 (32 Hen. 8 c. 25)
The Treason Act 1541 (33 Hen. 8 c. 20)
The Royal Assent by Commission Act 1541 (33 Hen. 8 c. 21)
See also 33 Hen. 8. c. 23
The Crown of Ireland Act 1542 (33 Hen. 8 c. 1 (I.))
The Treason Act 1543 (35 Hen. 8 c. 2)
See also 35 Hen.8 c.1 and c.3
The Treason Act 1547 (1 Ed. 6 c. 12)
The Riot Act 1549 (3 & 4 Edw. 6 c. 5)
The Treason Act 1551 (5 & 6 Edw. 6 c. 11)
The Treason Act 1553 (1 Mar. Sess. 1 c. 1)
See also 1 Mary Sess.2 c.6
The Treason Act 1554 (1&2 Ph. & M. c. 10)
See also 1&2 Ph. & M. c.9 and c.11
The Act of Supremacy 1558 (1 Eliz. 1 c. 1)
The Treason Act 1558 (1 Eliz. 1 c. 5)
The Supremacy of the Crown Act 1562 (5 Eliz. 1 c. 1)
The Clipping Coin Act 1562 (5 Eliz. 1 c. 11)
The Treasons Act 1571 (13 Eliz. 1 c. 1)
The Bulls, etc., from Rome Act 1571 (13 Eliz. 1 c. 2)
The Rebellion Act 1572 (14 Eliz. 1 c. 1)
The Escape of Traitors Act 1572 (14 Eliz. 1 c. 2)
The Coin Act 1572 (14 Eliz. 1 c. 3)
The Coin Act 1575 (18 Eliz. 1 c. 1)
The Religion Act 1580 (23 Eliz. 1 c. 1)
The Safety of the Queen, etc. Act 1584 (27 Eliz. 1 c. 1)
The Jesuits, etc. Act 1584 (27 Eliz. 1 c. 2)
The Treason Act 1586 (29 Eliz. 1 c. 2)
The Popish Recusants Act 1605 (3 Jac. 1 c. 4)
The Treasons Act 1649 (Act of the Parliament of the Commonwealth of England)
The Sedition Act 1661 (13 Car. 2 c. 1)
The Correspondence with Enemies Act 1691 (3 W. & M. c. 13)
The Treason Act 1695 (7 & 8 Will. 3 c. 3)
The Security of King and Government Act 1695 (7 & 8 Will. 3 c. 27)
The Coin Act 1696 (8 & 9 Will. 3 c. 26)
The Correspondence with the Pretender Act 1697 (9 Will. 3 c. 1)
The Correspondence with James the Pretender (High Treason) Act 1701 (13 Will. 3 c. 3)
The Security of the Succession, etc. Act 1701 (13 Will. 3 c. 6)
See also 1 Ann. c.9
The Treason Act 1702 (1 Ann. St. 2 c. 21) (and the Treason Act (Ireland) 1703 (2 Ann. c. 5), which makes equivalent provision)
The Mutiny Act 1703 (2 & 3 Anne c. 20)
The Correspondence with Enemies Act 1704 (3 Ann. c. 14)
The Regency Act 1705 (4 Ann. c. 8)

Great Britain
 20 acts (1707–1799)
The Succession to the Crown Act 1707 (6 Ann. c. 7)
The Treason Act 1708 (7 Ann. c. 21)
See also 7 Ann. c.25
The Treason Act 1714 (1 Geo. 1 Stat. 2 c. 33)
See also 1 Geo.1 Stat.2 c.20 and 1 Geo.1 Stat.2 c.50
The Coin Act 1732 (6 Geo. 2 c. 26)
The Counterfeiting Coin Act 1741 (15 Geo. 2 c. 28)
The Treason Act 1743 (17 Geo. 2 c. 39)
 The Habeas Corpus Suspension Act 1745 (19 Geo. 2 c. 1)
The Jurors (Scotland) Act 1745 (19 Geo. 2 c. 9)
see also 19 Geo.II c.26
The Treason Act 1746 (20 Geo. 2 c. 30)
see also 20 Geo. 2 c. 41 and c. 46
The Sheriffs (Scotland) Act 1747 (21 Geo. 2 c. 19)
The Treason Outlawries (Scotland) Act 1748 (22 Geo. 2 c. 48)
The Treason Act 1760 (33 Geo. 2 c. 26) (revived the expired Sheriffs (Scotland) Act 1747)
The Treason Act 1766 (6 Geo. 3 c. 53)
The Treason Act 1777 (17 Geo. 3 c. 9)
The Treason Act 1790 (30 Geo. 3 c. 48)
The Correspondence with Enemies Act 1793 (33 Geo. 3 c. 27)
The Treason Act 1795 (36 Geo. 3 c. 7)
The Counterfeiting Coin Act 1797 (37 Geo. 3 c. 126)
The Correspondence with Enemies Act 1798 (38 Geo. 3 c. 28)
The Treason Act 1799 (39 Geo. 3 c. 93)

United Kingdom
 16 acts (1800–2013)
The Treason Act 1800 (39 & 40 Geo. 3 c. 93)
The Treason Act 1814 (54 Geo. 3 c. 146)
The Treason Act 1817 (57 Geo. 3 c. 6)
The Treason (Ireland) Act 1821 (1 & 2 Geo. 4 c. 24)
The Forgery Act 1830 (11 Geo. 4 & 1 Will. 4 c. 66)
The Regency Act 1830 (1 Will. 4 c. 2)
The Coinage Offences Act 1832 (2 & 3 Will. 4 c. 34)
The Regency Act 1840 (3 & 4 Vict. c. 52)
The Treason Act 1842 (5 & 6 Vict. c. 51)
The Treason Felony Act 1848 (11 & 12 Vict. c. 12)
The Treason (Ireland) Act 1854 (17 & 18 Vict. c. 26)
The Forgery Act 1861 (24 & 25 Vict. c. 98)
The Treachery Act 1940 (3 & 4 Geo. 6 c. 40)
The Treason Act 1945 (8 & 9 Geo. 6 c. 44)
The Succession to the Crown Act 2013 (2013 c. 20) (amends the Treason Act 1351)

Ireland

Kingdom of Ireland

The Treason Act (Ireland) 1537 (28 Hen. 8 c. 7)
The Crown of Ireland Act 1542 (33 Hen. 8 c. 1 (I. Sect. II)
The Act of Supremacy (Ireland) 1560 (2 Eliz. 1 c. 1)
The Treason Act (Ireland) 1703 (2 Ann. c. 5 (I.))
The Treason Act (Ireland) 1765 (5 Geo. 3 c. 21 (I.))
The Treason by Women Act (Ireland) 1796 (36 Geo. 3 c. 31)

United Kingdom
The Treason (Ireland) Act 1821 (1 & 2 Geo. 4 c. 24)
The Treason (Ireland) Act 1854 (17 & 18 Vict. c. 26)

Republic of Ireland
The Treasonable Offences Act 1925 (repealed in 1939)
The Treason Act 1939

See also
List of short titles
High treason in the United Kingdom
Habeas Corpus Suspension Act

Notes

Treason
Laws in the United Kingdom